The name Harry Maitey was given by Germans to a native Hawaiian (April 23, 1807 – February 26, 1872), who was the first Hawaiian in Prussia, Germany. According to the records of Wilhelm von Humboldt, he stated Teoni as his father's name and Bete as his mother's. He married Dorothea Charlotte Becker from Stolpe on August 28, 1833. Their son Heinrich Wilhelm Otto (born December 2, 1837) and his younger sister Friederike Wilhelmine (born in 1846) died as infants, while their second son Heinrich Wilhelm Eduard (born December 8, 1839, died 1906) survived his parents. His daughter Martha (born 1869), Maitey's only grandchild attaining adulthood, remained unmarried.

Biography

Early life 

There is little known about Maitey's life in Hawai‘i. The information about his Hawaiian name Kaparena seems to have no confirmation from other sources. When the Prussian frigate Mentor arrived in Honolulu on November 28, 1823, the French whaler L'Aigle had left the harbour the day before with the Hawaiian king Liholiho and his queen Kamamalu the day before. Chiefs from other islands gathered on Oʻahu while the king was absent, and also the death of Keoua, the governor of Maui, caused an atmosphere of political uneasiness. It is unknown, if this situation urged Maitey to plead to be taken aboard of the Mentor, the first Prussian ship both to circumnavigate the globe as well as visiting Hawai‘i. Inquiries about the Hawaiian teenager confirmed, that he had no relatives, and he was allowed to leave Hawai‘i. The name Maitey was recorded by the Germans as Henry's (or Harry's) family name, but was obviously derived from the Hawaiian maika‘i or maita‘i.

Journey to Prussia 

Therefore, after the arrival of the Mentor in Swinemünde on September 14, 1824, the king was informed about the Sandwich islander, and decided on September 27, that the president of the Seehandlungsgesellschaft, Christian Rother, should bring him to Berlin. Maitey stayed in Rother's house there until the king decided on October 15, that he had to be educated in the German language and the principles of Christianity.

Education 

Maitey continued to live with the family of president Rother until 1827, when he moved to the Erziehungshaus vor dem Halleschen Tor, a school institution he had attended since 1825. In 1827 Maitey was invited to meet Wilhelm von Humboldt for conversations about the Hawaiian language, the result of which Humboldt presented first in the Berlin Academy of Sciences in 1828. Based on these conversations the Sandwich-Wörterverzeichnis (Sandwich glossary) served as foundation of his research on the Malayo-Polynesian languages and Maitey was Humboldt's most important source for the Hawaiian language.

From fall in 1829 he had a Hawaiian companion in the Erziehungshaus for about eight months, Jony Kahopimeai, who had come to Germany with the Prussian ship Princess Louise. After Maitey started to serve at Peacock Island Jony occasionally visited him, but in February 1831 he became ill, died from pneumonia and was buried on March 2, 1831.

Service at Peacock Island 

On April 23, 1830, Maitey was baptized and confirmed. He was given the German names Heinrich Wilhelm at the christening. In August Maitey was taken over by the royal household and assigned as assistant to the engine master at Peacock Island (German: Pfaueninsel). He was listed as a ward of the king and assistant to the engine master. However, it is documented that there was also a suggestion, that Maitey should become the ferryman of Peacock Island, but obviously his final assignments were a much better perspective for him.

In summer 1834 two Hawaiian geese (nēnē), which were brought to Germany on the ship Princess Louise as well, arrived also on the island.

The engine master Franciscus Joseph Friedrich trained Maitey as wood turner, locksmith, and cabinetmaker.

After some difficulties Maitey got the royal marriage consent with help from Christian Rother, and married Dorothea Charlotte Becker on August 25, 1833, in the church of Stolpe. After the wedding the couple moved to Klein-Glienicke, therefore Maitey had to travel to Peacock Island for work. Later he was more and more absent, which created difficulties for his relationship with Friedrich. Finally it was decided, that Maitey was assigned to the royal Garten Inspector Fintelmann.

While working under master Friedrich, Maitey apparently helped him building miniature replicas of famous castles and cathedrals from ivory and mother-of-pearl. The part of his carving skills seemed to be essential, because it was stated later, that Friedrich did not make the models anymore after Maitey left as his assistant. It is also suggested that Maitey was the artist who created some yellow room dividers in the castle, which were attributed to Friedrich as well.

Late years and descendants 

Living in Klein-Glienicke (Kurfürstenstraße 10) for the rest of his life, Maitey died of smallpox at his home on February 26, 1872, "a pensioner of the king, at the age of sixty-four." His grave still exists at a small cemetery not far from the church Ss. Peter and Paul at Nikolskoe near Peacock Island and is also the final resting place of his wife and his in-laws:
 Here rest in God the Sandwich Islander Maitey, 1872, and his wife Dorothy Becker Maitey, 1889
 Here rest in God the animal keeper Becker and his wife. They are the in-laws of the Sandwich Islander Maitey
 Inscriptions on the cross at the grave

Maitey's son Eduard believed, that his father was a Hawaiian prince, which was doubted by Caesar von der Ahé who published articles about Maitey in 1930 and 1933. Von der Ahé mentioned the name Kaparena as probably Maitey's Hawaiian name, but there are no such records in the Prussian documents. He also referred to files of the former Prussian court when he wrote, that Maitey's father was a soldier in Hawai‘i.

It is unknown, if Maitey's widow or Eduard had the chance to see King Kalākaua during his visit in Berlin and Potsdam in August, 1881. However, Eduard served as an actuary in Angermünde for some time before he returned to Potsdam for the rest of his life.

Cultural characteristics  

Maitey likely understood his relationship to the President of the Seehandlung Christian Rother as the usual adoption in Hawai‘i (hānai). This also explains the misunderstandings in the years 1829 and 1830, when Maitey hoped in vain to return to Rother's household.

A newspaper report from 1824 shows that Maitey performed a hula in Berlin, which can be identified as a hula noho:

Johann Gottfried Schadow who was strongly interested in physiognomy drew Maitey in 1824 and noted about his appearance:

Notes and references

Further reading 
 Michael Stoffregen-Büller: Der Sandwich-Insulaner. Von Polynesien auf Preußens Pfaueninsel. Henrik Bäßler Verlag, Berlin 2019,  (German)

External links 

 Heidemann, Wilfried M. Der Sandwich-Insulaner Maitey von der Pfaueninsel: Die Lebensgeschichte eines hawaiischen Einwanderers in Berlin und bei Potsdam von 1824 bis 1872. Mitteilungen des Vereins für die Geschichte Berlins 80. Jahrgang, Nr. Heft 2 (April 1984): 153–172, p. 159-160.

Hawaiian Kingdom people
Native Hawaiian people
People from Berlin
People from Potsdam
1807 births
1872 deaths
Hawaiian emigrants